Kashi Vishwanath Express is an Indian express train that runs between  in Uttar Pradesh and New Delhi railway station.

The train is named after the Kashi Vishwanath Temple in Varanasi. Main Citys along the way are Pratapgarh, Amethi, Raebareli, Lucknow, Hardoi,Shahjahanpur,Tilhar, Bareilly, Moradabad, Amroha and Ghaziabad. Kashi Vishwanath Express offers first A/C, second A/C, third A/C and sleeper-class coaches and pantry-car services. The Kashi Vishwanath Express is usually hauled by a WAP-7 locomotive. Its average running speed is very good.

Time table

Stops

New Delhi
Ghaziabad
Pilkhuwa
Hapur

Amroha
Moradabad
Rampur
Bareilly

Tilhar
Shahjahanpur
Anjhi Shahabad
Hardoi

Sandila

Bachhrawan

Amethi
Antu

Dandupur
Badshahpur

Suriawan 
Bhadohi
Parasipur
Sewapuri
Chaukhandi

Get Your Current pnr status

Gallery

See also
 Banaras railway station

Passenger trains originating from Varanasi
Transport in Delhi
Named passenger trains of India
Rail transport in Delhi
Express trains in India